The Robinson-Pavey House is a historic residence in western Washington Court House, Ohio, United States.  Named for its two prominent earliest residents, the house has been named a historic site.

After moving from another locality to Washington Court House, John H. Robinson arranged for the construction of the present house in 1849.  Part proprietor of a family-owned textile factory, Robinson was able to occupy the house in the following year.  He owned the property until 1861, when he sold it to local attorney Madison Pavey.  Besides his law practice, Pavey was locally prominent as one of the founders of the Bank of Fayette.

Built of weatherboarded walls on a foundation of sandstone, the Robinson-Pavey House is covered with an asphalt roof and features elements of wood and iron.  Among the prominent architectural elements of this Gothic Revival house are elaborate bargeboards at the ends of its tall gables; the roof is steeply pitched, and the house's shape is broken by a small "side" gable that includes a shutter-covered ogive window over the main entrance.  Piercing the walls are two doors, both of which possess small but elaborate hand-carven trim and brackets.

In 1987, the Robinson-Pavey House was listed on the National Register of Historic Places, qualifying because of its distinctive architecture; at the time of designation it was one of just two Gothic Revival houses in the city.

References

Houses completed in 1850
Buildings and structures in Fayette County, Ohio
Carpenter Gothic houses in Ohio
National Register of Historic Places in Fayette County, Ohio
Washington Court House, Ohio